The Mysterious Monkeys were a German esports organisation based in Leipzig, Germany, that formerly had players competing in Counter-Strike: Global Offensive, League of Legends, and Rainbow Six Siege. On 5 April 2018, the organisation rebranded and was renamed Ad Hoc Gaming.

League of Legends 
The Mysterious Monkeys entered the professional League of Legends scene on 22 September 2015, but did not participate in any major Riot-sponsored league until 19 May 2017, when they purchased Misfits Academy's spot in the European League of Legends Championship Series (EU LCS).

On 24 August 2017, the Mysterious Monkeys were relegated to the EU Challenger Series after losing 0–3 to the Ninjas in Pyjamas.

Final rosters

Counter-Strike: Global Offensive

League of Legends

Rainbow Six Siege

References 

Esports teams based in Germany
Defunct and inactive Counter-Strike teams
Former European League of Legends Championship Series teams
Tom Clancy's Rainbow Six Siege teams